NSSP may refer to:

Nava Sama Samaja Party, a Trotskyist political party in Sri Lanka
Next Steps in Strategic Partnership, a military cooperation agreement between the US and India